Guerrino Tosello (born 14 October 1943) is an Italian racing cyclist. He won stage 7 of the 1968 Giro d'Italia.

References

External links
 

1943 births
Living people
Italian male cyclists
Italian Giro d'Italia stage winners
Place of birth missing (living people)
Cyclists from the Province of Padua